In the 2012–13 season, USM Alger competed in the Ligue 1 for the 35th time, as well as the Algerian Cup.  It was their 18th consecutive season in the top flight of Algerian football.

Players
Last updated on  18 November 2016

Pre-season and friendlies

Competitions

Ligue 1

League table

Results summary

Results by round

Matches

Algerian Cup

CAF Confederation Cup

First round

Second round

UAFA Club Cup

Second round

Quarter-finals

Semifinals

Final

Squad information

Playing statistics

Appearances (Apps.) numbers are for appearances in competitive games only including sub appearances
Red card numbers denote:   Numbers in parentheses represent red cards overturned for wrongful dismissal.

Goalscorers
Includes all competitive matches. The list is sorted alphabetically by surname when total goals are equal.

Clean sheets 
Includes all competitive matches.

Transfers

In

Out

References

USM Alger seasons
Algerian football clubs 2012–13 season